Michael Anthony Torres Monge (born January 15, 1994), known by his stage name Myke Towers, is a Puerto Rican rapper, singer and songwriter.

Career 
His mixtape El Final del Principio (2016) peaked at 12 on Latin Rhythm Albums. Towers collaborated with Bad Bunny with the song "Estamos Arriba" released in June 2019. On July 5, 2019, Piso 21 released the single "Una Vida Para Recordar" featuring Towers. He collaborated with Becky G with the song "Dollar"; a music video was released July 12, 2019. His first studio album Easy Money Baby was released on January 23, 2020. His EP Para Mi Ex was released on December 16, 2020. His second album, Lyke Mike, was released on April 23, 2021.

Discography

Studio albums

Singles

As lead artist 

Notes

As featured artist

Other charted and certified songs

Other guest appearances

Music videos

Awards and nominations

Notes

References 

1994 births
Living people
People from Río Piedras, Puerto Rico
Latin trap musicians
Puerto Rican rappers
Puerto Rican reggaeton musicians
21st-century Puerto Rican male singers
Singers from San Juan, Puerto Rico
Latin music songwriters
Warner Music Latina artists